Charleson Park is a 7.14-hectare park along False Creek, located in the Fairview neighborhood of Vancouver, British Columbia, Canada. It has skyline views of the city.

References

Parks in Vancouver